Garter snake is a common name for generally harmless, small to medium-sized snakes belonging to the genus Thamnophis in the family Colubridae. Native to North and Central America, species in the genus Thamnophis can be found from the subarctic plains of Canada to Costa Rica.

With about 35 recognized species and subspecies, garter snakes are highly variable in appearance. They generally have large round eyes, round pupils, a slender build, keeled scales, and a pattern of longitudinal stripes that may or may not include spots (although some have no stripes at all).

With no real consensus on the classification of species of Thamnophis, disagreement between taxonomists and sources such as field guides over whether two types of snakes are separate species or subspecies of the same species is common. Garter snakes are closely related to the genus Nerodia (water snakes), with some species having been moved back and forth between genera.

Taxonomy 
The first garter snake to be scientifically described was the eastern garter snake (now Thamnophis sirtalis sirtalis), by zoologist and taxonomist Carl Linnaeus in 1758.  The genus Thamnophis was described by Leopold Fitzinger in 1843 as the genus for the garter snakes and ribbon snakes. Many snakes previously identified as their own genera or species have been reclassified as species or subspecies in Thamnophis. There are currently 35 species in the genus, with several subspecies in some of them.

Habitat 
Garter snakes are present throughout most of North America. Their wide distribution is due to their varied diets and adaptability to different habitats, with varying proximity to water. However, in the western part of North America these snakes are more aquatic than in the eastern portion. Garter snakes live in a variety of habitats, including forests, woodlands, fields, grasslands and lawns, but never far from water, often an adjacent wetland, stream or pond. This reflects the fact that amphibians are a large part of their diet. Garter snakes are often found near small ponds with tall weeds.

Behavior

Garter snakes have complex systems of pheromonal communication. They can find other snakes by following their pheromone-scented trails. Male and female skin pheromones are so different as to be immediately distinguishable. However, male garter snakes sometimes produce both male and female pheromones. During the mating season, this ability fools other males into attempting to mate with them. This causes the transfer of heat to them in kleptothermy, which is an advantage immediately after hibernation, allowing them to become more active. Male snakes giving off both male and female pheromones have been shown to garner more copulations than normal males in the mating balls that form at the den when females enter the mating melee. A snake hatch can include as many as 57 young.

Garter snakes use the vomeronasal organ to communicate via pheromones through the tongue flicking behavior which gathers chemical cues in the environment. Upon entering the lumen of the organ, the chemical molecules will come into contact with the sensory cells which are attached to the neurosensory epithelium of the vomeronasal organ.

If disturbed a garter snake may coil and strike but typically it will hide its head and flail its tail. These snakes will also discharge a malodorous, musky-scented secretion from a gland near the cloaca. They often use these techniques to escape when ensnared by a predator. They will also slither into the water to escape a predator on land. Hawks, crows, egrets, herons, cranes, raccoons, otters and other snake species (such as coral snakes and kingsnakes) will eat garter snakes, with even shrews and frogs eating the juveniles.

Being heterothermic, like all reptiles, garter snakes bask in the sun to regulate their body temperature. During brumation (the reptile equivalent of hibernation) garter snakes typically occupy large communal sites called hibernacula. These snakes will migrate large distances to brumate.

Diet

Garter snakes, like all snakes, are carnivorous. Their diet consists of almost any creature they are capable of overpowering: slugs, earthworms (nightcrawlers, as red wigglers are toxic to garter snakes), leeches, lizards, amphibians (including frog eggs),  minnows, and rodents. When living near water they will eat other aquatic animals. The ribbon snake (Thamnophis sauritus) in particular favors frogs (including tadpoles), readily eating them despite their strong chemical defenses. Food is swallowed whole. Garter snakes often adapt to eating whatever they can find and whenever they can find it because food can be either scarce or abundant. Although they feed mostly on live animals they will sometimes eat eggs.

Venom
Garter snakes were long thought to be non-venomous but discoveries in the early 2000s revealed that they in fact produce a neurotoxic venom. Despite this, garter snakes cannot seriously injure or kill humans with the small amounts of comparatively mild venom they produce and they also lack an effective means of delivering it. In a few cases some swelling and bruising have been reported. They do have enlarged teeth in the back of their mouth but their gums are significantly larger and the secretions of their Duvernoy's gland are only mildly toxic.

Evidence suggests that garter snake and newt populations share an evolutionary link in their levels of tetrodotoxin resistance, implying co-evolution between predator and prey. Garter snakes feeding on toxic newts can also retain those toxins in their liver for weeks, making those snakes poisonous as well as venomous.

Conservation status
 

Despite the decline in their population from collection as pets (especially in the more northerly regions, in which large groups are collected at hibernation), pollution of aquatic areas, and the introduction of American bullfrogs as potential predators, garter snakes are still some of the most commonly found reptiles in much of their ranges. The San Francisco garter snake (Thamnophis sirtalis tetrataenia), however, has been on the endangered list since 1969. Predation by crayfish has also been responsible for the decline of the narrow-headed garter snake (Thamnophis rufipunctatus). Many breeders have bred all species of garter snakes, making it a popular breed.

Species and subspecies

Arranged alphabetically by scientific name:

In the above list, a binomial authority or a trinomial authority in parentheses indicates that the species or subspecies was originally described in a genus other than Thamnophis.

See also

Narcisse Snake Dens
List of snakes, overview of all snake families and genera

References

Further reading
Conant R (1975). A Field Guide to Reptiles and Amphibians of Eastern and Central North America, Second Edition. Boston: Houghton Mifflin Company. xviii + 429 pp. + Plates 1-48.  (hardcover),  (paperback). (Genus Thamnophis, p. 157).
Fitzinger L (1843). Systema Reptilium, Fasciculus Primus, Amblyglossae. Vienna: Braumüller & Seidel. 106 pp. + indices. (Thamnophis, new genus, p. 26). (in Latin).
Goin, Coleman J., Goin, Olive B.; Zug, George R. (1978). Introduction to Herpetology, Third Edition. San Francisco: W.H. Freeman and Company. xi + 378 pp. . (Thamnophis, pp. 132, 156, 326).
Powell R, Conant R, Collins JT (2016). Peterson Field Guide to Reptiles and Amphibians of Eastern and Central North America, Fourth Edition. Boston and New York: Houghton Mifflin Harcourt. xiv + 494 pp., 47 plates, 207 figures. . (Genus Thamnophis, p. 426).
Ruthven AG (1908). "Variation and Genetic Relationships of the Garter-snakes". Bulletin of the United States National Museum 61: 1–201, 82 figures.
Schmidt, Karl P.; Davis, D. Dwight (1941). Field Book of Snakes of the United States and Canada. New York: G.P. Putnam's Sons. 365 pp., 34 plates, 103 figures. (Genus Thamnophis, p. 236).
Stebbins RC (2003). A Field Guide to Western Reptiles and Amphibians, Third Edition. The Peterson Field Guide Series ®. Boston and New York: Houghton Mifflin Company. xiii + 533 pp., 56 plates. . (Genus Thamnophis, pp. 373–374).
Vandenburgh J, Slevin JR (1918). "The Garter-snakes of Western North America". Proceedings of the California Academy of Sciences, Fourth Series 8: 181–270, 11 plates.

External links

Anapsid.org: Garter snakes
Several pictures of a Mexican ribbon snake (Thamnophis proximus rutiloris)
Plains garter snake - Thamnophis radix. Species account from the Iowa Reptile and Amphibian Field Guide
Eastern garter snake - Thamnophis sirtalis. Species account from the Iowa Reptile and Amphibian Field Guide
Descriptions and biology of garter snakes

Extant Miocene first appearances
Reptiles of Canada
Reptiles of the United States
Reptiles of Mexico
Snake common names
Snakes of Central America
Taxa named by Leopold Fitzinger
Thamnophis